Niki James Birrell (born 16 August 1976) is a British Paralympic sailor. Alongside Alexandra Rickham, he has won four IFDS World Championship titles and in the 2012 Summer Paralympics the pair took the bronze medal in the SKUD 18 two person keelboat class.

Sailing
Birrell, who was born with cerebral palsy, began sailing at a young age after being introduced to the hobby by his father. He and his brother Christian became a competing pair and in 2002 they were selected for the British team in the 420 class.

Birrell competed in the 2008 Paralympic Sailing Competition in the SKUD 18 two person keelboat class alongside teammate Alexandra Rickham, where he finished fifth. Between 2009 and 2011 Birrell and Rickham have won four IFDS World Championship titles.

Birrell was selected to represent Great Britain at the 2012 Summer Paralympics held in London, United Kingdom. He competed in the SKUD 2-person keelboat event with Rickham, for which they took the bronze medal.

References

External links
 
 

1986 births
Living people
British male sailors (sport)
Paralympic sailors of Great Britain
Paralympic bronze medalists for Great Britain
Paralympic medalists in sailing
Sailors at the 2008 Summer Paralympics
Sailors at the 2012 Summer Paralympics
Sailors at the 2016 Summer Paralympics
Medalists at the 2012 Summer Paralympics
Medalists at the 2016 Summer Paralympics
Sportspeople from Manchester